The 2013–14 FA Trophy was the 44th season of the FA Trophy, the Football Association's cup competition for teams at levels 5–8 of the English football league system. A total of 276 clubs entered the competition, which was won by Cambridge United, who beat Gosport Borough 4–0 in front of 18,120 spectators at Wembley.

Calendar

Preliminary round
Ties will be played on 5 October 2013. 

† – After extra time

First round qualifying
Ties will be played on 19 October 2013. Teams from Premier Division of Southern League, Northern Premier League and Isthmian League entered in this round. 

† – After extra time

Second round qualifying
Ties will be played on 2 November 2013 

† – After extra time

Third round qualifying
Ties will be played on 16 November 2013. This round is the first in which Conference North and South teams join the competition. 

† – After extra time

First round
Ties will be played on 30 November 2013. This round is the first in which Conference Premier teams join those from lower reaches of the National League System. 

† – After extra time

Second round
Ties will be played on 14 December 2013. 

† – After extra time

Third round
Ties will be played on 11 January 2014. 

† – After extra time

Fourth round
Ties will be played on 1 February 2014.

† – After extra time

Semi-finals

First leg

Second leg

Final

References

2013–14
2013–14 domestic association football cups
2013–14 in English football